A chorus line is a large group of dancers who together perform synchronized routines, usually in musical theatre. Sometimes, singing is also performed.

Chorus line dancers in Broadway musicals and revues have been referred to by slang terms such as ponies, gypsies and twirlies. A chorus girl or chorine is a  performer in a chorus line (i.e. the chorus of a theatrical production), in contrast to terms such as chorist or chorister (a member of a choir).

While synchronized dancing indicative of a chorus line (often composed of chorus girls) was vogue during the first half of the 20th century, modern theatre uses the terms "ensemble" or "chorus" to indicate all supporting players in a stage production. These supporting players often also play minor characters, move set pieces, and support the production in other unique ways.

History 
In the mid-1800s, chorus lines of cartwheeling, synchronized dancing can-can girls began sprouting up throughout Paris with even edgier, more erotic cabarets found in venues like the Moulin Rouge, Le Lido, and the Folies Bergẻre. By the late 1860s, the scandalous trend found its way to the United States with a more conservative trend of chorus lines hitting England, including Tiller Girls and Gaiety Girls. Chorus lines throughout Western Europe and the United States largely owned the stages of the early twentieth century.

Chorus lines hit vogue in the 1920s and 30s, as the life and possibilities of a chorus girl became sensationalized in fiction, newspapers, and film, capturing the imaginations of young girls seeking independence, adventure, and a happily ever after. Real-life examples of the Cinderella narrative included Lilian Russel and Billie Dove, both of whom began their careers as chorus girls and married into wealth.

For girls hoping to make a career out of performing, the chorus line was a common place of entry. Big names of the day like Paulette Goddard, Barbara Stanwyck, and Billie Dove are just some of the stars who began successful performing careers by joining a chorus line.

One of the most popular productions of the time was the Ziegfeld Follies, operating out of New York City, which was well-known for hiring only the most striking women for the chorus line. Florence Ziegfeld Jr. received the reputation of being able to objectively define and select exceptionally beautiful women. Ziegfeld's standards, then, soon became the ideal, and publications and news articles circulated with headlines like, "How I pick my Beauties" and "Picking out pretty girls for the stage".

Decades later, chorus lines of a more erotic flavor found huge success on America's west coast in Las Vegas, before declining again in the face of competition from burlesque and strip clubs.

Some popular chorus lines found their way onto the golden screen. One group in particular was Samuel Goldwyn's dancers, the Goldwyn Girls. Popping up in numerous MGM productions, the famous Goldwyn Girls included stars who went on to find great success on-screen like Lucille Ball, Betty Grable, Virginia Mayo, and Jane Wyman.

To this day, some live performance venues keep the traditional chorus line alive with groups like The Rockettes, but more frequently the term "chorus line" in modern terms is used to differentiate supporting singers and dancers of any gender in a musical or musical revue from the lead actors or performers.

Famous chorus lines
Gaiety Girls (started in England during the 1890s)
The Rockettes (U.S. act founded in 1925)
Tiller Girls (international act starting in the 1890s)
Ziegfeld girls

Famous performers

Performers who started out dancing in chorus lines include:

Louise Alexander
June Allyson
Carroll Baker
Josephine Baker
Lucille Ball
Tallulah Bankhead
Patricia Barry
Constance Bennett
Joan Blondell
Karin Booth
Betty Boothroyd
Anise Boyer
Louise Brooks
Virginia Bruce
Ruth Chatterton
June Clyde
Imogene Coca
Ellen Corby
Jeanne Crain
Joan Crawford
Marion Davies
Bette Davis
Yvonne De Carlo
Frances Dee
Myrna Dell
Marlene Dietrich
Caren Marsh Doll
Ruth Donnelly
Constance Dowling
Doris Dowling
Ja'Net DuBois
Alice Faye
Kay Francis
Rhonda Fleming
Paulette Goddard
Betty Grable
June Haver
June Havoc
Rita Hayworth
Patricia Heaton
Audrey Hepburn
Miriam Hopkins
Lena Horne
Adele Jergens
Dorothy Jordan
Madeline Kahn
Ruby Keeler
Phyllis Kennedy
Evelyn Keyes
Dorothy Lamour
Ruta Lee
Myrna Loy
Jeanette MacDonald
Dorothy Mackaill
Shirley MacLaine
Dorothy Malone
Marsha Mason
Jessie Matthews
Virginia Mayo
Vera Miles
Ann Miller
Eve Miller
Florence Mills
Mistinguett
Marilyn Monroe
Dorothy Morris
Nita Naldi
Evelyn Nesbit
Julie Newmar
Sheree North
Aida Pierce
Jean Porter
Marie Prevost
Marjorie Reynolds
Ginger Rogers
Jean Rogers
Ruth Roman
Joan Shawlee
Ann Sheridan
Ada "Bricktop" Smith
Barbara Stanwyck
Inger Stevens
Amzie Strickland
Nita Talbot
Tyra Vaughn
Gwen Verdon
Marie Windsor
Toby Wing
Shelley Winters
Jane Wyman

See also
Can-can
Friedrichstadt-Palast
Showgirl
Corps de ballet

References

External links

Musical theatre
Dance in the United States